Chróstowo (German 1939-1945 Reisicht)  is a village in the administrative district of Gmina Dąbrowa Biskupia, within Inowrocław County, Kuyavian-Pomeranian Voivodeship, in north-central Poland.

History
During the German occupation of Poland (World War II), Chróstowo was one of the sites of executions of Poles, carried out by the Germans in 1939 as part of the Intelligenzaktion.

References

Villages in Inowrocław County